is a former Japanese football player.

Club statistics

References

External links

j-league

1988 births
Living people
Miyazaki Sangyo-keiei University alumni
Association football people from Kagoshima Prefecture
Japanese footballers
J2 League players
Japan Football League players
FC Gifu players
Fujieda MYFC players
Tegevajaro Miyazaki players
Association football goalkeepers